The speaker of the Ohio House of Representatives is the presiding officer of the Ohio House of Representatives. The Speaker is third in line to the Office of the Governor

 | (party affiliations for pre-1874)

Ohio
Speakers